Faisal Hossain (born 26 October 1978) is a Bangladeshi cricketer. He played international cricket for Bangladesh in 2004, one Test match and four One Day Internationals without establishing himself in the side. After poor performances at international level, Hossain drifted out of the international squad. He represents Chittagong Division in Bangladesh's domestic competition. Although primarily a batsman, Hossain is a part-time left arm spin bowler.

Career
Hossain made his One Day International (ODI) debut against the West Indies on 18 May 2004, scoring 17 runs at number five. He played three more ODIs, the last on 29 July 2004 against Pakistan where he scored 17 which remained his highest score.

He made his Test debut on 28 May 2004 against West Indies, batting at number six where scored 5 and 2.

Although he was drafted in as cover for the injured captain, Habibul Bashar, in the ICC Champions Trophy in August 2004, Hossain did not play another international match.

Hossain's bowling action came under scrutiny in 2007 and was under suspicion of throwing. He was allowed to bowl in competitive cricket under supervision, but faced a life ban after his action was reported again. He has not bowled since the 2007/08 season. 
In the 2008 English cricket season, Hossain represented Chislehurst and West Kent Cricket Club in the Kent Cricket League in England.

In December 2008, Hossain was recalled to the Bangladesh squad to face Sri Lanka at home four years after playing his last Test. At the time of his selection, Hossain was a prolific run-scorer in Bangladesh's 2008/09 first-class competition. He scored 983 runs at an average of 70.56. Playing for the Chittagong Division, he scored bulk of runs for his side which also contains experienced national team players like Aftab Ahmed, Nafees Iqbal, Tamim Iqbal, Talha Jubair and Nazimuddin. After another successful season in 2009–10 where he was the 2nd highest run scorer in the domestic league in four-day matches, he got into the one-day side again for Bangladesh's tour to England. He went on to play 2 one-day matches and scored his highest score (26*) in ODI cricket. He was involved in an incident when he was bowling in the 1st ODI. A crafty left-arm spinner, he was bowling to Ian Bell and beat him with his flight. Wicketkeeper and then vice-captain of Bangladesh Mushfiqur Rahim also missed the flight of the ball and the ball went through his helmet grills and stuck him in the nose. Rahim missed the remainder of the series due to the injury. However, he was dropped for the 2nd one-day which Bangladesh won, beating England by 5 runs. Bangladesh went on to lose the series 2–1.
His next assignment was against Ireland where he came to bat at No.8 and scored an unbeaten 8*. Bangladesh, down 1–0 against Ireland, came back well and drew the series 1–1. After the England tour, Hossain was dropped from the Bangladesh setup. He went back to domestic cricket and kept on scoring runs. In the 2010–11, he was one of the most consistent performers in the league and earned a place in the Bangladesh A side which will tour South Africa in January 2012.

References

External links
 

1978 births
Living people
Bangladesh One Day International cricketers
Bangladesh Test cricketers
Bangladeshi cricketers
Chattogram Challengers cricketers
Chittagong Division cricketers
Cricketers at the 2010 Asian Games
Asian Games medalists in cricket
Medalists at the 2010 Asian Games
Asian Games gold medalists for Bangladesh
Khelaghar Samaj Kallyan Samity cricketers
Legends of Rupganj cricketers
Mohammedan Sporting Club cricketers
Bangladesh East Zone cricketers
Bangladesh under-23 cricketers
People from Chittagong